The Myrtle Beach Bowl is an NCAA Division I Football Bowl Subdivision (FBS) college football bowl game first played in December 2020 in the Myrtle Beach metropolitan area. Coastal Carolina University hosts the game at its Brooks Stadium in Conway, South Carolina, which has a capacity of 20,000 seats following an expansion project completed prior to the 2019 season. Owned by ESPN Events, the bowl has tie-ins with Conference USA, the Mid-American Conference and the Sun Belt Conference. The affiliation contract with ESPN Events has each conference supplying a team four times in a six-year bowl cycle from 2020 to 2025.

Background
In 2013,  "Group of Five" conferences were looking to start bowl games for their leagues, as the Power Five conferences "prefer to play each other in bowl games". The NCAA had a restriction on championship games, including bowl games, being held in South Carolina due to display of the Confederate flag on State House grounds, which was lifted in July 2015. Organizers for the Medal of Honor Bowl, an all-star game, announced their intent to apply for NCAA sanctioning as a traditional postseason bowl game featuring FBS college teams, with a tentative game date of December 18, 2016. However, in April 2016, the NCAA announced a three-year moratorium on new bowl games.

History
In June 2018, the NCAA indicated that the Grand Strand area was approved for a bowl game. The Myrtle Beach Bowl was subsequently announced on November 13, 2018, by ESPN Events, with tie-ins to three conferences: the Sun Belt Conference, Conference USA (C-USA), and Mid-American Conference (MAC). During 2017–18 bowl season, there had been three teams that were bowl eligible but did not go to a bowl, as all slots were filled: Western Michigan and Buffalo from the MAC, and UTSA from C-USA.

The bowl made its debut as part of the 2020–21 bowl season, matching North Texas of C-USA and Appalachian State of the Sun Belt.

Game results

MVPs

Appearances by team
Updated through the December 2022 edition (3 games, 6 total appearances).

Appearances by conference
Updated through the December 2022 edition (3 games, 6 total appearances).

Independent appearances: UConn (2022)

Media coverage

Television

Radio

Game records
Updated through the December 2022 game.

References

External links

College football bowls
Myrtle Beach Bowl
Conway, South Carolina
Annual sporting events in the United States
American football in South Carolina
Recurring sporting events established in 2020
2020 establishments in South Carolina